Alexander Dercho (born 21 January 1987) is a retired German footballer. He was born Alexander Krük, before taking his wife's name in 2013.

Retirement
In 2017, Dercho suffered from a cartilage injury and never fully recovered from that. At the end of the 2018–19 season, he decided to retire, having played only eight games in the season.

References

External links 
 Alexander Krük at eintracht-archiv.de 
 

1987 births
Living people
German footballers
Association football fullbacks
Borussia Mönchengladbach II players
Eintracht Frankfurt players
VfL Osnabrück players
Kickers Emden players
Arminia Bielefeld players
Bundesliga players
2. Bundesliga players
3. Liga players
People from Remscheid
Sportspeople from Düsseldorf (region)
Footballers from North Rhine-Westphalia